Otvane is a settlement in the Sindhudurg district in the Indian state of Maharashtra. It is located 10 km (6.2 mi) from the taluka of Sawantvadi.

Nearby cities
Savantwadi (10 km)
Banda

Nearest hill station
Amboli

Nearest railway station
Savantwadi Road

Nearest airport
Kolhapur (KLH) (Maharashatra)
Belgaum (IXG) (Karnataka)

Places of interest
Terekhol River
Ravalnath Mandeer

Temples

Otvane has historical value. In Otvane Village there is a temple of the god Ravalnath.

Nature and wildlife

Shree Ravalnath mandeer

Education
Z.P. School No.1 (From 1st to 7th Std)
Z.P. School No.2 (From 1st to 7th Std)
Z.P. School No.3 (From 1st to 4th Std)
Z.P. School No.4 (From 1st to 4th Std)
Shree Ralvanath Vidyamandeer (From 8th to 10th Std)
Satellite view of Tilari Dam

External links

Otvane Satellite image in Google Maps

Cities and towns in Sindhudurg district
Princely states of India